Ophthalmotilapia is a small genus of four cichlid species endemic to Lake Tanganyika in East Africa.

Species
There are currently four recognized species in this genus:
 Ophthalmotilapia boops (Boulenger, 1901)	  
 Ophthalmotilapia heterodonta (Poll & Matthes, 1962)	  
 Ophthalmotilapia nasuta (Poll & Matthes, 1962)	  
 Ophthalmotilapia ventralis (Boulenger, 1898)

References

 
Ectodini
Fish of Africa
Cichlid genera
Taxa named by Jacques Pellegrin